Elvet Bridge is a medieval masonry arch bridge across the River Wear in the city of Durham, in County Durham, England. It links the peninsula in central Durham and the Elvet area of the city, and is a Grade I listed building.

Building
Building of the bridge began in AD 1160 in the time of Bishop Hugh de Puiset (1153–95). De Puiset, also known as "Bishop Pudsey" was a powerful Prince Bishop who instigated a significant amount of building work in northern England. A key reason for building the bridge was the urban development taking place in what was the then Elvet borough. The bridge took many years to complete: in 1225 and 1228 indulgences were still being granted to people who contributed to "the building of the new bridge at Elvet". Of the current arches only one is late 12th century; the remainder are 13th century.

Elvet bridge was not Durham's first bridge over the Wear. The Foedarium of Durham Cathedral Priory, compiled early in the 15th century, records:
Bishop Hugo built the bridge of Elvit, called the New Bridge to distinguish it from the other bridge, already built, which is called the Old Bridge.

The bridge has 10 visible arches, but there is some dispute over how many arches exist in total. The early 16th-century antiquary John Leland believed there were 14 arches, but this has never been proven. The river flows through four full arches – the remaining are dry or partly so. The early 19th-century antiquary Robert Surtees wrote that there were 10 arches, and this number has been verified. Others may be hidden beneath the street on the Elvet side or beneath Souter Peth.

Subsequent history
The bridge was repaired extensively in the time of Bishop Foxe between 1495 and 1501, and again in 1601. A flood in 1771 badly damaged the bridge and the three central arches were renewed.

In the Middle Ages Elvet Bridge was guarded by a gate and towers, and there was a number of buildings on the bridge. They included a chapel at either end: St James' at the western end and St Andrew's on a pier at the eastern end. St James' chapel was replaced with a House of Correction (prison) in 1632. In the 18th century the House of Correction and many buildings at the north end of the bridge were demolished.

The chapel on the eastern, Elvet, side of the bridge has partially survived and is particularly visible from the riverbanks to the south. A number of buildings incorporate part of the bridge, and 18 Elvet Bridge is also Grade I listed as a result.

The bridge is reputed to be the narrowest row-through bridge in Europe.

References

Sources

Bridges completed in the 13th century
Bridges across the River Wear
Bridges in County Durham
Buildings and structures in Durham, England
Grade I listed bridges
Durham, Elvet